Events in the year 2004 in Gabon.

Incumbents 

 President: Omar Bongo Ondimba
 Prime Minister: Jean-François Ntoutoume Emane

Events 

 13 – 29 August – The country competed at the 2004 Summer Olympics in Athens, Greece.

Deaths

References 

 
2000s in Gabon
Years of the 21st century in Gabon
Gabon